Ravinder 'Ravi' Singh Nagra (born 29 August 1978) is an English cricketer.  Nagra is a right-handed batsman who bowls left-arm fast-medium.  He was born in West Bromwich, West Midlands.

Nagra made his debut for Herefordshire in the 1999 Minor Counties Championship against Wales Minor Counties.  From 1999 to 2003, he represented the county in 10 Championship matches, the last of which came against Devon.  His MCCA Knockout Trophy debut for the county came against Wales Minor Counties in 1999.  From 1999 to 2002, he represented the county in 7 Trophy matches, the last of which came against the Warwickshire Cricket Board.

He also represented Herefordshire in 3 List A matches.  These came against Worcestershire in the 2001 Cheltenham & Gloucester Trophy, Suffolk in the 2nd round of the 2002 Cheltenham & Gloucester Trophy which was played in 2001 and the Durham Cricket Board in the 2nd round of the 2003 Cheltenham & Gloucester Trophy which was played in 2002.  In his 3 matches, he scored 154 runs at a batting average of 51.33, with a single century high score of 105, while in the field he took a single catch.

References

External links
Ravi Nagra at Cricinfo
Ravi Nagra at CricketArchive

1978 births
Living people
Sportspeople from West Bromwich
English cricketers
Herefordshire cricketers